Lyall Wilkes (19 May 1914 – 28 March 1991) was an English historian, circuit judge and Labour Party politician.

Biography 

A noted barrister and later judge in the North-East of England, Wilkes was a member of Broad Chare Chambers, a leading group of barristers in the area. A prolific writer, notably of biographies, his works included books on the lives of William Eden, Francis Festing and John Dobson.

As a politician Wilkes won the Newcastle upon Tyne Central seat from Arthur Denville in the 1945 general election and held the seat until he left politics in 1951.

Following his death in 1991 Wilkes was buried in St. Mary Magdalene's Church Whalton.

References

External links 
 

1914 births
1991 deaths
English biographers
20th-century English judges
Labour Party (UK) MPs for English constituencies
UK MPs 1945–1950
UK MPs 1950–1951
20th-century biographers